Tsunami Relief Cardiff was a charity music concert held at the Millennium Stadium in Cardiff on 22 January 2005, in aid of the victims of the 2004 Indian Ocean earthquake, which had occurred the month before. The concert raised £1,248,963.

The concert was, at the time, the biggest charity concert in the United Kingdom since Live Aid over 20 years before, and more than 60,000 fans watched live, with many millions more from around the world viewing the seven-hour-long concert. The main tickets sold out in 3 days; when a further 1,000 tickets were issued, they sold in 20 minutes.

The concert featured a range of music styles, with long standing veterans such as Eric Clapton, Jools Holland, Lulu, classical performers in Aled Jones, Charlotte Church and Katherine Jenkins and Welsh rock groups such as Feeder, the Manic Street Preachers and, representing The Stereophonics Kelly Jones contributing. Midge Ure also made a surprise appearance at the concert, who introduced Feeder.

The concert began with little known Wrexham band Camera, but this was not shown on the TV broadcasts. For the television and internet audience, the show was started by classical singer Katherine Jenkins, with "Amazing Grace", "Caruso" and "You'll Never Walk Alone"; the audience waving red LED torches to represent victims of the Asian disaster. The music continued throughout the evening with an electric atmosphere culminating in a sing-a-long finale with Jools Holland and Eric Clapton playing "Shake, Rattle and Roll" accompanied by many of the artists who had performed throughout the day (who all waived their usual fees).

The concert was carried live by BBC Radio Wales, and on UK digital television via the BBC's "red-button" service as well as being streamed online. Video highlights were available on the BBC's website soon thereafter, and TV highlights were also broadcast on BBC2 during the evening.

Line-up

(in alphabetical order)
Badly Drawn Boy
Camera (Wrexham band)
Charlotte Church
Eric Clapton
Craig David
Embrace
Feeder
Goldie Lookin' Chain
Jools Holland
Katherine Jenkins
Aled Jones
Kelly Jones, lead singer of Stereophonics
Keane
Lemar
Liberty X
Lulu
Manic Street Preachers
Brian McFadden
Raghav
Heather Small
Snow Patrol

See also
 List of music concerts at the Millennium Stadium

References

External links
Concert homepage
Tsunami Relief Cardiff information from BBC Wales
Coverage of Charlotte Church's performance at event (includes video files and images)
Fan Photos and Videos from the Concert

Musical advocacy groups
Benefit concerts in the United Kingdom
2005 in British music
2005 in Wales
2000s in Cardiff